Atlantiades or Atlantiadis may refer to:

 Hermes, Olympian god. His mother, Maia was the daughter of Atlas, whence he is also called Atlantiades.
 Hermaphroditus,  was the son of Aphrodite and Hermes. Because he was a son of Hermes, and consequently a great-grandson of Atlas, he is also called Atlantiades.